This list of Numéro Tokyo cover models  is a catalog of cover models who have appeared on the cover of the Japanese edition of Numéro magazine, starting with the magazine's first issue in April 2007.

2007

2008

2009

2010

2011

2012

2013

2014

2015

2016

2017

2018

2019

External links
 Numéro Tokyo
 Numero Tokyo on Models.com

Tokyo